Luis Trujillo (born December 3, 1993, in Tijuana) is a Mexican professional footballer who plays for Dorados de Sinaloa of the Ascenso MX.

External links

Living people
1993 births
Mexican footballers
Club Tijuana footballers
Association football defenders
Dorados de Sinaloa footballers
Cafetaleros de Chiapas footballers
Tuxtla F.C. footballers
Coras de Nayarit F.C. footballers
Liga MX players
Ascenso MX players
Liga Premier de México players
Tercera División de México players
Sportspeople from Tijuana
Footballers from Baja California